CR Davis may refer to:
Chester R. Davis (1896–1966), American businessman
Carl Raymond Davis (1911–1940), British/American fighter pilot